Giving Voice is a 2020 American documentary film, directed and produced by James D. Stern and Fernando Villena. The film follows the 2018 edition of the annual August Wilson Monologue Competition entered by thousands of high school students for the opportunity to perform on Broadway. Viola Davis, John Legend, Constanza Romero and Nicholas Caprio serve as executive producers.

The film had its world premiere at the 2020 Sundance Film Festival, where it won the Festival Favorite award. It was released on December 11, 2020, by Netflix.

Synopsis
Thousands of high school students enter the yearly August Wilson monologue competition for the opportunity to perform on Broadway. Denzel Washington, Viola Davis, Jack Viertel, Gerardo Navarro, Nia Sarfo, Freedom Martin, Cody Merridith, Callie Holley and Aaron Guy appear in the film.

Release
The film had its world premiere at the 2020 Sundance Film Festival on January 26. Shortly after, Netflix acquired distribution rights to the film. It was released on December 11, 2020.

Reception
At the Sundance Film Festival, the film won the Festival Favorite Award.

In December 2020, the film was named as a New York Times Critic's Pick.

References

External links
 
 

2020 films
2020 documentary films
American documentary films
Documentary films about theatre
Netflix original documentary films
2020s English-language films
Films directed by James D. Stern
2020s American films